John Allen Midgett Jr. (August 25, 1876 – February 9, 1938) was a senior enlisted member of first the United States Life-Saving Service, and later the United States Coast Guard.

Biography
Midgett grew up on Cape Hatteras, on the outer banks of the North Carolina coast, and like his father and other family members, he enlisted in the Life–Saving Service in 1898.
Midgett remained in command of a life–saving station when the United States Revenue Cutter Service merged with the Life–Saving Service to form the Coast Guard in 1915.

On August 16, 1918, Midgett was the keeper of the Chicamacomico Lifeboat Station when he led his power surfboat crew on the celebrated rescue of the 42 crew members of the British tanker Mirlo.
The UK Board of Trade awarded Midgett a silver cup in 1918, and he was awarded the Gold Lifesaving Medal six years later.

In 1992, the Coast Guard renamed the USCGC Midgett to the USCGC John Midgett.

Midgett was injured in an automobile accident in late 1937 and died on February 9, 1938.

Legacy
According to the Dictionary of North Carolina Biography Midgett was friends with Franklin Delano Roosevelt, and his funeral was attended by a number of congressmen.

References

External links

1876 births
1938 deaths
United States Life-Saving Service personnel
United States Coast Guard enlisted